Talbach is a small river of Baden-Württemberg, Germany. In Göggingen, district of Krauchenwies, it flows from the right via the Triebwerkskanal Ott into the Ablach.

See also
List of rivers of Baden-Württemberg

References

Rivers of Baden-Württemberg
Rivers of Germany